Saruma is a monotypic genus of flowering plants in the family Aristolochiaceae containing the single species Saruma henryi. It is endemic to China, where it occurs in Gansu, Guizhou, Hubei, Jiangxi, Shaanxi, and Sichuan.

This species is a perennial herb growing from a system of rhizomes. The erect stem is up to a meter tall. The heart-shaped leaves are up to 15 by 13 centimeters. It produces yellowish or yellow-green flowers. The fruit is a follicle.

References

Aristolochiaceae
Monotypic magnoliid genera
Piperales genera
Endemic flora of China
Taxonomy articles created by Polbot
Taxa named by Daniel Oliver